Virtuoso is a 36-foot-tall, 21-ton outdoor concrete sculptural group by David Adickes. It was installed in 1983 on the outskirts of the Theater District in downtown Houston next to the Lyric Centre building. It was commissioned as a work that "paid homage to music, dance and performing arts".

Description
Viewed from the intersection of Prairie and Smith Streets, the sculpture is a gigantic cello being played by a virtuoso who is invisible except for his head and hands. Behind the sculpture adjacent to the Lyric Centre, a life-sized trio of abstract musicians including a violinist, bass, and flute player accompany the giant cellist. The work is equipped with an integrated sound system that plays classical music for passing pedestrians.

History
Virtuoso, the artist's favorite work, was his first large-scale sculpture to garner major public exposure. It initially was controversial with critics and many residents panning the sculpture; however, with time, it has been embraced as an iconic landmark.

In 2005, the president of the Lyric Centre's property management group ordered the giant cellist's mustache to be painted black without consulting the artist. After Adickes and others in the arts community said it overstepped its bounds in altering the artwork, the property management company provided a bucket truck and paint so that the artist could repaint the mustache white.

See also

 1983 in art
 List of public art in Houston

References

1983 establishments in Texas
1983 sculptures
Concrete sculptures in Texas
Musical instruments in art
Outdoor sculptures in Houston
Sculptures of men in Texas